Deudas is a Spanish comedy television series created by Daniel Écija that originally aired on Atresplayer Premium from 24 January to 18 April 2021. The cast features Carmen Maura, Mona Martínez, Carmen Ruiz and Salva Reina, among others.

Premise 
The plot concerns the histrionic rivalry between two families, respectively led by Pepa Carranza and Doña Consuelo de la Vega.

Cast

Production 

Created by Daniel Écija, Deudas was produced by Atresmedia Televisión in collaboration with Good Mood. Jesús Mesas Silva, Sara Cano, Jorge Valdano Sáenz and Javier Andrés Roig joined Écija as part of the writing team. Direction duties were tasked to Oriol Ferrer, David Molina, Luis Oliveros, Pol Rodríguez and Patricia Font. Montse García and Daniel Écija were credited as executive producers.

Atresmedia greenlighted the project in June 2020. Shooting lasted from July to October 2020. It took place in Madrid and in the set of Infinia Studios in Boadilla del Monte. The district of Vicálvaro was a prime shooting location, with production extensively working around the Plaza de Don Antonio de Andrés.

Release 
The series premiered on Atresplayer Premium on 24 January 2021. Consisting of 13 episodes featuring a running time of around 50 minutes, the weekly broadcasting run ended on 18 April 2021.

References 

Atresplayer Premium original programming
2021 Spanish television series debuts
2020s Spanish comedy television series
Television series by Good Mood
Spanish-language television shows
Television shows filmed in Spain